Chrysoteuchia argentistriellus is a moth in the family Crambidae. It was described by John Henry Leech in 1889. It is found in Korea.

References

Crambini
Moths described in 1889
Moths of Asia